Archirhoe neomexicana is a species of geometrid moth in the family Geometridae. It is found in Central America and North America.

The MONA or Hodges number for Archirhoe neomexicana is 7295.

References

Further reading

 
 

Hydriomenini
Articles created by Qbugbot
Moths described in 1896